Brian Thompson (born 5 March 1962) is a British yachtsman. He was the first Briton to twice break the speed record for sailing around the world, and the first to sail non-stop around the world four times. He is highly successful offshore racer on all types of high-performance yachts, from 21-foot Mini Transat racers to 140-foot Maxi Trimarans.

Biography
He started his career in the OSTAR in 1992 with his own yacht. He sailed a lot on multihulls with Steve Fosset with whom he set several records, mainly the around the world sailing record in 2004.

In 2005, he won the Oryx Quest, round the world crewed race, on Doha 2006, ex-Club Med. In 2006, he won the Volvo Ocean Race on ABN AMRO One as a crewmember of Mike Sanderson. The same year, he finished 6th in the Route du Rhum, in IMOCA class. He finished 5th of the Vendée Globe 2008–2009 on a 60 feet IMOCA class .

In 2012, he won the Jules Verne Trophy as helmsman and trimmer for Loïck Peyron, on the maxi-multihull Banque Populaire V. He then became the first British sailor with four non-stop laps of the world.

Caterham Challenge
Following the announcement in April that Brian had joined MGI in the role as sailing director, MGI announced on 15 May 2013 that Caterham Technology and Caterham Composites, part of the Caterham Group, have joined with MGI CEO Mike Gascoyne and MGI Sailing Director Brian Thompson to run a Class40 offshore racing campaign under the banner of "Caterham Challenge".

This two-year campaign follows on from Mike's successful 2012 solo transatlantic aboard a "Caterham Challenge" branded Class40.
The Campaign objectives are to bring F1 standards of technology and logistics to off-shore racing, to encourage green, sustainable and reusable energy technologies in the marine, automotive and aerospace sectors and to utilize Caterham's extensive experience in F1, R&D, engineering, competitive sailing and sports marketing.

MGI built an Akilara RC3 Class40 and launched the racing boat in late August. Caterham Challenge was first on public display during the Southampton boat show 2013 followed by sailing and training in The Solent and the English Channel.

The racing calendar for "Caterham Challenge" includes the Transat Jacques Vabre 2013, the Grenada sailing week and the Caribbean 600 in early 2014, together with the Global Ocean Race, leaving from the Southampton Boatshow in September 2014 around the world.

Caterham Challenge started at the Transat Jacques Vabre on 7 November 2013 with Mike Gascoyne as skipper and Brian Thompson as co-skipper, leaving Le Havre, France for Itajai, Brazil.

References

External links
 
Maxi Trimaran Banque Populaire V
MGIconsultancy.com
CaterhamChallenge.com

British male sailors (sport)
English male sailors (sport)
Living people
1962 births
Volvo Ocean Race sailors
Volvo 70 class sailors
IMOCA 60 class sailors
Vendée Globe finishers
British Vendee Globe sailors
2008 Vendee Globe sailors